National Route 406 is a national highway of Japan connecting Ōmachi, Nagano and Takasaki, Gunma in Japan, with a total length of 192.5 km (119.61 mi).

References

National highways in Japan
Roads in Gunma Prefecture
Roads in Nagano Prefecture